Jeff White is a visual effects artist who was nominated for Best Visual Effects at the 85th Academy Awards and 90th Academy Awards for The Avengers and Kong: Skull Island, respectively.

Selected filmography
 Kong: Skull Island (2017)
 Warcraft (2016)
 Transformers: Age of Extinction (2014)
 Marvel's The Avengers (2012)
 Transformers: Dark of the Moon (2011)
 Transformers: Revenge of the Fallen (2009)
 Indiana Jones and the Kingdom of the Crystal Skull (2008)
 Transformers (2007)
 Pirates of the Caribbean: Dead Man's Chest (2006)
 The Chronicles of Narnia: The Lion, the Witch and the Wardrobe (2005)
 Star Wars: Episode III – Revenge of the Sith (2005)

References

External links
 

Living people
Special effects people
Year of birth missing (living people)